Lahja Tuulikki Ukkola (28 November 1943 – 28 May 2019) was a Finnish politician and journalist. Born in Taivalkoski, she began working for the newspaper Kaleva in 1962. As a member of the Liberal People's Party, she served as an MP for the Oulu constituency from 1991 to 1995. She was also the leader of the party between 1993 and 1995. Following the 2007 national parliamentary election, Ukkola was again elected as an MP for Oulu, this time for the National Coalition Party, serving until 2011.

Ukkola died on 28 May 2019 in Oulu, at the age of 75.

References

External links

 

1943 births
2019 deaths
Finnish journalists
Liberals (Finland) politicians
Members of the Parliament of Finland (1991–95)
Members of the Parliament of Finland (2007–11)
National Coalition Party politicians
People from Taivalkoski
Women members of the Parliament of Finland
Finnish women journalists
21st-century Finnish women politicians